John Edward Healy (1872–1934) was an Irish journalist and barrister and was editor of The Irish Times from 1907 until 1934.  The 27 years as editor is the longest for that position at the paper.
Healy was born on St. Patrick's day 1872, in Drogheda, County Louth, the son of a solicitor James Stanislaus Healy and his mother Kate Mary Appleyard was the daughter of a Church of Ireland clergyman. Educated in Drogheda Grammar School and Trinity College Dublin he graduated with a degree in Literature and Classics, winning prizes while at college. He taught in Rathmines and at Alexandra College. He studied law and was called to the bar in 1906 although never practiced. 
A journalist he wrote for the Dublin Evening Mail, and was editor of it for two years, before joining the Irish Times, during his time at the Irish Times he also served as special representative for the London Times in Ireland.
A member of the Church of Ireland, he served as editor of The Church of Ireland Gazette.

Healy was a staunch Unionist, had shots were fired at his home during the War of Independence, he defended the Unionist cause in his writings in the Irish Times as his obituary in The Times of London it was noted that, he was the protagonist of a losing cause.

Healy married Adeline Alton (1872–1961) in 1898 and had two sons.  Ernest Alton Healy was a flight lieutenant with the RAF, and Lewis Edward Healy was a journalist.  He died in 1934 at the age of 62.  He is buried in Deans Grange Cemetery.

References

1872 births
1934 deaths
Irish barristers
Alumni of Trinity College Dublin
The Irish Times editors
People from County Louth
Burials at Deans Grange Cemetery